Hersha Parady (born May 25, 1945) is an American actress best known for her role of Alice Garvey in Little House on the Prairie.

Life and career 
Parady was born as Betty Sandhoff in Berea, Ohio and attended Berea High School. She began acting locally at age 14 in Cleveland area theatrical productions. She moved west in the early 1970s to further her acting career and landed a role opposite Jon Voight in a touring production of A Streetcar Named Desire.

Parady began her career in television with guest-appearances in Mannix, Bearcats! and The Waltons. Hersha was considered to play Caroline Ingalls in Little House on the Prairie, but lost out to Karen Grassle.  Later, in 1976 episode Journey in the Spring, Paraday played Eliza Anne Ingalls, Charles' sister-in-law.
Then in 1977 she was given the role of Alice Garvey in Little House on the Prairie, which she played until 1980 when her character was killed in a fire accidentally set by Albert Ingalls. After Little House on the Prairie, she made only rare appearances in television, including Kenan & Kel.

She was once married to Oscar-winning producer John Peverall and had one child with him. She was friends with fellow Little House actors Katherine MacGregor, Richard Bull, and Dabbs Greer until their deaths. She was also once close to Patrick Labyorteaux who played her son  Andrew Garvey and his brother Matthew Labyorteaux, who played Albert Ingalls, and Little House make-up artist Whitey, and hair master Larry Germain.

Filmography

References

External links 

Hersha Parady Interview, HERSHA PARADY, Alice Garvey (+Eliza Ingalls)

1945 births
Living people
American film actresses
American stage actresses
American television actresses
Actresses from Ohio
21st-century American women